Joutjärvi is a lake in the Möysä district of Lahti, Finland. There is a Canoeing centre, Joutjärven melontakeskus.

See also
Joutjärvi church

References

Lakes of Lahti